Rose Elizabeth "Libby" Cleveland (June 13, 1846 – November 22, 1918) served as first lady of the United States from 1885 to 1886, during the first term of her brother, President Grover Cleveland's two administrations. The president was a bachelor until he married Frances Folsom on June 2, 1886, fourteen months into his first term.

Life and career

Rose Elizabeth Cleveland was born in Fayetteville, New York, on June 13, 1846. Known to her family as "Libby", Rose was the youngest of nine children born to Richard Falley Cleveland and Ann Neal Cleveland. In September 1853, the family moved to Holland Patent, New York, where her father had just been appointed pastor of the Presbyterian church. He died the following month, with Rose being seven years old at the time of her father's death.

Rose stayed in Holland Patent to care for her widowed mother. Grover Cleveland, Rose's elder brother, was 16 years old at the time and was determined to help support his family.  He left school and went to New York City to work as a teacher at the State School for the Blind. Rose was educated at Houghton Seminary in Clinton, New York, where she later became a teacher to support herself and also help support her widowed mother.

Rose also taught at the Collegiate Institute in Lafayette, Indiana, and at a girls school in Muncy, Pennsylvania, where she taught in the late 1860s. At Muncy Seminary Rose was known for her strong personality and independence.

Rose gained a nickname within her circle of friends in Muncy; they called her "Johnny Cleveland" because she was usually found reading a book under an old tree at a nearby farm. Rose then prepared a course of historical lectures; one lecture, in particular, focused on altruistic faith, which she delivered before the students of Houghton Seminary and at other schools.

In the 1880s Rose returned to Holland Patent to care for her ailing mother. During this time she taught at Sunday School and did some work in literature. When not employed in this manner, she devoted herself to her aged mother in the homestead at Holland Patent until her mother's death in 1882.  After Ann Neal Cleveland's death, Rose was left alone at the homestead known as "The Weeds."

Rose continued to teach Sunday School and give lectures. In one lecture on altruistic faith, she stated, "We cannot touch humanity at large, except as we touch humanity in the individual. We make the world a better place through our concrete relationships, not through our vague, general good will. We must each find a true partner, someone who understands and appreciates us, someone whose faith in us brings out our best efforts. Our deepest craving is for recognition—to be known by another human being for what we truly are."

White House years
When her elder brother, Grover Cleveland, became the 22nd President of the United States in March 1885, Rose assumed the duties of First Lady and lived in the White House for fifteen months. She stood by her brother during his inauguration and was his hostess during his bachelor years in the White House.

During her early tenure as First Lady, Rose received front-page treatment from The New York Times about her appearance during her second reception at the White House.  The newspaper reported that Miss Cleveland wore a dress of black satin, with entire overdress of Spanish lace. The satin bodice was cut low and sleeveless, and the transparent lace revealed the shoulders and arms. Rose Cleveland did not completely fit into Washington high society. It was said, "Rose Cleveland was a bluestocking, more interested in pursuing scholarly endeavors than in entertaining cabinet wives and foreign dignitaries."  Rose was an intellectual, and she preferred to lecture rather than entertain, but she made sure to perform her duties as First Lady as a favor to her brother.

When President Cleveland married Frances Folsom, Rose left the White House and began a career in education. She became the principal of the Collegiate Institute of Lafayette, Indiana, a writer and lecturer, and the editor of the Chicago-based magazine Literary Life.

Later years

At age 44, she started a relationship with a wealthy widow, Evangeline Marrs Simpson, with explicitly erotic correspondence. The tone of their letters cooled when Evangeline married an Episcopal bishop from Minnesota, Henry Benjamin Whipple, despite Cleveland's protests.

After Whipple's death in 1901, the two women rekindled their relationship and eventually, in 1910, moved to Bagni di Lucca, Italy, to live there together. They shared the house with the English illustrator and artist Nelly Erichsen. Rose died at home on November 22, 1918, at 7:32 in the evening during the 1918 flu pandemic.  She was buried there in the English Cemetery, and Evangeline was also buried next to Rose in the same cemetery 12 years later.

Works
 Rose Elizabeth Cleveland works at Hathi Trust
 Rose Elizabeth Cleveland works at archive.org

References
Notes

Further reading
Hardy, Rob. "The Passion of Rose Elizabeth Cleveland." New England Review 28.1 (2007): 180, 193, 207
Lillie, Lucy C. "The Mistress of the White House." Lippincotts Monthly Magazine 1887: 81–94
"Society Stars." Boston Daily Globe (Mar 14 1886): 4.

1846 births
1918 deaths
19th-century American educators
19th-century American LGBT people
19th-century American women educators
19th-century American women writers
19th-century American writers
20th-century American women writers
20th-century American writers
Acting first ladies of the United States
American expatriates in Italy
American lesbian writers
Deaths from Spanish flu
Grover Cleveland family
Infectious disease deaths in Tuscany
LGBT people from New York (state)
People from Fayetteville, New York
People from Oneida County, New York
Writers from New York (state)